8373 Stephengould (1992 AB) is an outer main-belt binary asteroid discovered on 1 January 1992 by Carolyn S. Shoemaker and Eugene Merle Shoemaker at Palomar Observatory. The asteroid was named after the Harvard paleontologist Stephen Jay Gould. The asteroid has a very high inclination, having the second highest inclination of any of the first 10,000 discovered asteroids in the asteroid belt, after 2938 Hopi.

Stephengould is one of few strongly unstable asteroids located near the 2:1 mean motion resonance with the gas giant Jupiter, that corresponds to one of the prominent Kirkwood gaps in the asteroid belt.

The asteroid has a moon orbiting it, discovered in 2010 with an orbital period of 1 day, 10 hours, and 9 minutes.

See also
 List of minor planets

References

External links 
 Lightcurve plot of 8373 Stephengould, Palmer Divide Observatory, B. D. Warner (2004)
 Patrick Moore's Data Book of Astronomy, Cambridge University Press (2011)
 Asteroids with Satellites, Robert Johnston, johnstonsarchive.net
 Asteroid Lightcurve Database (LCDB), query form (info )
 Dictionary of Minor Planet Names, Google books
 Asteroids and comets rotation curves, CdR Observatoire de Genève, Raoul Behrend
 Discovery Circumstances: Numbered Minor Planets (1)–(5000) Minor Planet Center
 
 

008373
008373
Discoveries by Carolyn S. Shoemaker
Discoveries by Eugene Merle Shoemaker
Named minor planets
008373
19920101